2J or 2-J may refer to:

2J, International Air Transport Association code for Air Burkina
Chaparral 2J, a model of Chaparral Cars
2J, an abbreviation for Second Epistle of John
Kawasaki P-2J, Japanese derivative of the Lockheed P-2 Neptune, an American military aircraft
HQ-2J, a Chinese military missile
Thor DSV-2J, see Thor DSV-2
ISS 2J/A, alternate designator for Space Shuttle mission no. STS-127
SSH 2J (WA), see Washington State Route 527
Thompson School District R2-J

See also
J2 (disambiguation)